This is a list of South Korean basketball players.

Women

B
 Beon Yeon-ha

C
 Cho Hey-jin
 Choi Aei-young
 Choi Kyung-hee
 Choi Youn-ah
 Chun Joo-weon
 Chung Eun-soon

H
 Hong Hyun-hee
 Hur Yoon-ja

J
 Jang Sun-hyoung
 Jeong Myung-hee
 Jin Mi-jung
 Jung Mi-ran
 Jung Sun-min

K
 Kang Ji-sook
 Kim Dan-bi
 Kim Eun-sook (basketball)
 Kim Hwa-soon
 Kim Ji-yoon
 Kim Kwe-ryong
 Kim Yeong-ok
 Kim Young-hee (basketball)

L
 Lee Eun-ju (basketball)
 Lee Hyung-sook
 Lee Jong-ae
 Lee Mi-ja (basketball)
 Lee Mi-sun

M
 Moon Kyung-ja

P
 Park Chan-sook
 Park Jung-eun
 Park Yang-gae

S
 Sin Jung-ja
 Sung Jung-a

U
 Sonia Ursu-Kim

W
 Wang Su-jin

Y
 Yang Jung-ok

Men

C
 Cho Dong-kee
 Cho Sang-hyun
 Cho Sung-min (basketball)
 Choi Jin-soo
 Choi Jun-yong (basketball)
 Chun Hee-chul

H
 Ha Seung-jin
 Heo Il-young
 Heo Ung
 Hur Jae
 Hyun Joo-yup
 Heo Hoon

J
 Jeon Jun-beom
 Joo Hee-jung

K
 Kim Hyun-jun
 Kim Jiwan
 Kim Jong-kyu
 Kim Joo-sung (basketball)
 Kim Min-goo (basketball)
 Kim Seung-hyun (basketball)
 Kim Sun-hyung
 Kim Tae-sul
 Kim Yoo-taek
 Kim Si-rae

L
 Lee Seung-hyun (basketball)
 Lee Chung-hee (basketball)
 Lee Jong-hyun (basketball)
 Lee Jung-hyun (basketball)
 Lee Jung-suk
 Lee Kyu-sup
 Lee Sang-min (basketball)
 Lee Seung-jun (basketball)
 Lee Won-woo
 Lim Dong-seob

M
 Moon Kyung-eun
 Moon Tae-jong

O
 Oh Se-keun

P
 Park Chan-hee (basketball)

S
 Seo Jang-hoon
 Shin Dong-pa

W
 Woo Ji-won

Y
 Yang Dong-geun (basketball)
 Yang Hee-jong
 Yang Hong-seok
 Yoo Jae-hak

External links 
 Korean Basketball League (KBL)

 
Basketball
Korean, South